A black knight is a literary stock character.

Black Knight or Black Knights may also refer to:

Arts and entertainment

Comics
 The Black Knight (comics), a 1998 Scrooge McDuck story
 Black Knight (Marvel Comics), several Marvel Comics characters
 Black Knight (manga), a 2003 yaoi manga by Kai Tsurugi
 The Black Knights, a fictional resistance movement in the anime series Code Geass

Film
 The Black Knight (film), a 1954 film starring Alan Ladd
 Black Knight (film), a 2001 film starring Martin Lawrence
 Black Knight (Monty Python), character in the film Monty Python and the Holy Grail

Games
 Black Knight (pinball), a pinball game by Williams Electronics
 MechWarrior 4: Black Knight, an expansion pack of the computer game MechWarrior 4: Vengeance
 The Black Knight, a major antagonist in Fire Emblem: Path of Radiance and Fire Emblem: Radiant Dawn
Sonic and the Black Knight, a 2009 Wii game by Sonic Team
Black Knight, a major antagonist in the video game Shovel Knight

Music
 Black Knights (rap group), affiliated with The Wu-Tang Clan
 The Black Knights (band), a Mersey Beat band
 The Black Knight (Elgar), a symphony/cantata written by Edward Elgar in 1889–1893

Television
 Black Knight: The Man Who Guards Me, a 2017 South Korean TV series
 Black Knight (South Korean TV series), a 2022 South Korean TV series
 Victor Newman, from the CBS soap opera The Young and the Restless, called the Black Knight

Military
 57th Fighter-Interceptor Squadron, a USAF fighter squadron known as "The Black Knights of Keflavik"
 VFA-154, a US Navy fighter squadron nicknamed "The Black Knights"
 VMFA-314, a US Marine Corps fighter squadron nicknamed "The Black Knights"
 VMM-264, a US Marine Corps tiltrotor squadron nicknamed "The Black Knights"
 RSAF Black Knights, a precision aerobatics team of the Republic of Singapore Air Force
 "The Black Knights", the display team of No. 54 Squadron RAF in the 1950s
 5th Cavalry Regiment, a United States Army unit referred to as "The Black Knights"

Nickname
 Ralph de Ashton (fl. 1421–1486), an officer of state under Edward IV of England
 Zawisza Czarny (1379–1428), Polish knight and diplomat
 Gary Player (born 1935), South African professional golfer
 Eduard Ritter von Schleich (1888–1947), Bavarian World War I flying ace and World War II Luftwaffe general
 James Stewart, the Black Knight of Lorn (c. 1383-after 1451), Scottish nobleman

Sports
 Black Knight (horse) (1979–2002), Australian Thoroughbred racehorse
 Army Black Knights, the nickname of the sporting teams of the United States Military Academy
 Black Knights, the sports teams and (singular) mascot at:
 Baltimore City College, Baltimore, Maryland, US
 Charlottesville High School, Charlottesville, Virginia, US
 Vegas Golden Knights, a name considered Las Vegas Black Knights

Science and technology
 Black Knight (rocket), part of the British rocketry program in the 1950s
 Black Knight (vehicle), an unmanned ground vehicle designed by BAE Systems
 TrES-2b, an exoplanet colloquially known as "Black Knight" due to its darkness
 Camacinia othello, a species of dragonfly

Other uses
 Black knight, a knight in chess
 Black Knight, a magazine for Aboriginal Australians produced in Brisbane by Bill Rosser in 1975
 Black Knight (Arthurian legend), any of several knights clad in black armor in Arthurian legend
 Black Knight (company), an American technology company
 Black Knight satellite conspiracy theory, a conspiracy theory about an alien satellite
 Knight of Glin or Black Knight, an Irish hereditary knighthood
 Vincent Black Knight, a British motorcycle made between 1954 and 1955 by Vincent Motorcycles

See also
 Black Night (disambiguation)
 Dark Knight (disambiguation)
 White Knight (disambiguation)

Lists of people by nickname